The 2018–19 winter transfer window for Maltese football transfers opened on 1 January and closed on 31 January. Additionally, players without a club may join at any time and clubs may sign players on loan at any time. This list includes transfers featuring at least one Premier League or First Division club which were completed after the end of the summer 2018 transfer window and before the end of the 2018–19 winter window.

Transfers

References 

Transfers winter
Malta
2018–19